Leke is a town in Diksmuide, a part of Belgium in the province of West Flanders.

Gallery

Populated places in West Flanders
Sub-municipalities of Diksmuide